Andura is an H chondrite meteorite that fell to Earth on August 9, 1939, in Maharashtra, India.

Classification
It is classified as ordinary chondrite and belongs to the petrologic type 6, thus was assigned to the group H6.

References

See also 
 Glossary of meteoritics
 Meteorite falls
 Ordinary chondrite

Meteorites found in India